Second Harvest of Silicon Valley (abbreviated SHSV) is a food bank based in San Jose, California, that serves Santa Clara and San Mateo counties, including Silicon Valley and the San Francisco Peninsula. With $ in revenue in 2019, it is the largest food bank in the San Francisco Bay Area and the 12th largest in the United States. , it serves about 500,000 people on average per month. It is affiliated with Feeding America, a national network of food banks, as well as the California Association of Food Banks. Leslie Bacho is the organization's chief executive officer.

History 
Second Harvest of Silicon Valley began in 1974 as The Food Bank of Santa Clara County, a program of the now-defunct nonprofit organization Economic and Social Opportunities Inc. In 1979, The Food Bank Inc. of Santa Clara County incorporated as a separate nonprofit organization and joined the Second Harvest system, now called Feeding America.

After federal government subsidies to Second Harvest ended in 1984, The Food Bank and the smaller San Mateo County Food Bank relied solely on donations, and Catholic Charities of San Mateo County began administering the San Mateo County Food Bank. In October 1988, the two food banks merged to become Second Harvest Food Bank of Santa Clara and San Mateo Counties.

In 1998, Second Harvest began accepting online monetary donations as well as online donations of groceries through Peapod.

On July 30, 2019, the organization adopted its current name, Second Harvest of Silicon Valley.

Facilities 
Second Harvest operates four distribution centers, including:

 The  Curtner Center opened in 1992 in San Jose.
 The  Peninsula Distribution Center (Bing Center) opened in 1996 in San Carlos.
 The Cypress Center opened in 2012 in North San Jose as a dedicated distribution facility for fresh produce.

The Bing Center would remain in San Carlos.

Second Harvest distributes groceries through a network of over 300 partner agencies throughout both counties. Forty percent of the people who assist with Second Harvest programs are volunteers.

Demographics 
During the COVID-19 pandemic, Second Harvest served about 500,000 people on average per month, an increase from 250,000 people before the pandemic began. Most families it serves have working parents who experience food insecurity due to the San Francisco Bay Area's high cost of living amid the California housing shortage. A quarter of the organization's clients are college-educated and 11% are homeless.

See also 

 Alameda County Community Food Bank
 List of food banks

References

External links 
 

Food banks in California
Non-profit organizations based in the San Francisco Bay Area
Organizations based in San Jose, California
Organizations established in 1974
Organizations established in 1988
Silicon Valley